Sanza may refer to:

People
 Nick Sanza, Canadian retired ice hockey goaltender
 Nicola Di Sanza (born 1990), Italian football player

Places
 Sanza (Tanzanian ward), Tanzania
 Sanza, Campania, Italy
 Sanza Pombo, Angola

Other
 Sanza, also known as mbira, African musical instrument
 Sanza, a word and concept used in Zande literature, esp. proverbs